Gene Stone (born October 6, 1951) is an American writer and editor known for his books on animal rights and plant-based food.

Early life and editorial career
Gene Stone grew up in the Westchester County suburb of Pelham, New York, the son of lawyer Henry Stone and author/editor Babette Rosmond, and the brother of James Stone, founder and CEO of Plymouth Rock Assurance Corporation. . His godfather was one of his mother’s best friends, humorist Henry Morgan, and that was the secret that had Gene featured on Henry’s television show, I’ve Got a Secret, when Gene was three years old. He cried throughout the entire segment. He did better in school. After graduating Phi Beta Kappa from Stanford and receiving his masters in English Literature from Harvard, Stone joined the Peace Corps, where he spent two years in the Republic of Niger. Returning to New York, he then started a career as an editor. He began at Harcourt Brace, where he edited a wide range of books including Patricia Bosworth's biography of Montgomery Clift. He then worked at Bantam Books, where he helped launch its hardcover division by acquiring such books as Albert Goldman's biography of John Lennon and Kareem Abdul-Jabbar's autobiography. Next, he worked as a senior editor at Esquire, editing authors ranging from Alan Furst and Bobbie Ann Mason to Michael Kinsley and Joel Kotkin. He then moved to Los Angeles, where he was West Coast editor of Simon & Schuster, a consulting editor at the Los Angeles Times, and editor in chief of California Magazine.

Writing career

In 1988 Stone began a career as a writer and ghostwriter. He has written extensively for magazines, including New York Esquire, GQ, and Vogue, but eventually dedicated his livelihood to books. His first ghostwritten project was for the Nicaraguan politician Arturo Cruz Jr., Memoirs of a Counter-Revolutionary (1988). Since then Stone has written more than forty books with a diverse group of people, including theoretical physicist Stephen Hawking, former Yahoo! Chief Solutions Officer Tim Sanders, medical director of Canyon Ranch Resorts Mark Liponis, CNN executive vice-president Gail Evans, and TOMS Shoes founder Blake Mycoskie (The #1 New York Times bestseller Start Something That Matters).

Stone has written many other books under his own name, including, The Secret of People Who Never Get Sick, which has been translated into more than 30 languages; and Little Girl Fly Away, which he co-produced as a television movie. An avid watch collector, Stone appeared on CBS News Sunday Morning (October 29, 2006) discussing his book, The Watch, the definitive book of men's wristwatches. The book was thoroughly updated and published in a new edition in 2018 with a new co-author, Hodinkee.com managing editor Stephen Pulvirent. Stone has also written a number of instant books for various publishers on presidential politics, including the #1 Washington Post bestseller The Bush Survival Bible and the #1 Los Angeles Times bestseller The Trump Survival Guide. Stone serves on the board of several not-for-profit organizations, including Surgeons Over Seas (SOS), which saves lives in developing countries by improving surgical care, and Truth Will Out (TWO), a non-profit think tank and educational organization that defends the LGBT community against anti-gay misinformation.  He has also written about his own experiences with conversion therapy and sexual surrogacy for New York Magazine, (The Tiger Cure).

Plant-based writing

In 2006 Stone, a vegan, met firefighter Rip Esselstyn, and the two of them collaborated on the hugely successful book about a low-fat, whole foods, plant-based diet, The Engine 2 Diet, which in turn was the basis of a product line at Whole Foods Market. They then co-wrote two bestselling sequels. Under his own name, Stone wrote the companion book to the documentary Forks Over Knives, a film which also explores plant-based diets that was a #1 New York Times bestseller. Over the last fifteen years Stone has ghostwritten, co-written, or authored many other books on plant-based diets and their relationship to health, animal protection, and the environment, many of which have been national bestsellers. These include Living the Farm Sanctuary Life, with Farm Sanctuary President and Co-founder Gene Baur; How Not To Die with Dr. Michael Greger (which was followed up with a cookbook); Mercy for Animals (with Mercy for Animals founder Nathan Runkle); Animalkind (co-authored with PETA co-founder Ingrid Newkirk); Eat for the Planet and Eat for the Planet Cookbook (co-authored with www.onegreenplanet.com founder Nil Zacharias); Rescue Dogs, with undercover animal investigator Pete Paxton; Healthy at Last, with Eric Adams, Mayor of New York City; and 72 Reasons to be Vegan with Kathy Freston.

Works
1989 Memoirs of a Counter-Revolutionary (Ghostwriter for Arturo Cruz), Doubleday, 
1992 Stephen Hawking's A Brief History of Time: A Reader’s Companion (in collaboration with Stephen Hawking), Bantam, 
1994 Little Girl Fly Away, Simon & Schuster, 
1997 Dr Fulford's Touch of Life (co-writer with osteopath Robert C. Fulford), Gallery, 
1998 The Halo Effect: How Volunteering Can Lead to a More Fulfilling Life and a Better Career (co-written with Outward Bound CEO John Reynolds), Golden Books Adult Publishing, 
2000 Play Like a Man, Win Like a Woman (Ghostwriter with CNN executive VP Gail Evans), Broadway, 
2002 Kindred Spirits: How the Remarkable Bond Between Humans and Animals Can Change the Way we Live, (Ghostwriter for veterinarian Allen Shoen), Broadway, 
2002 Love is the Killer App (Ghostwriter for Yahoo! Chief Solutions Officer Tim Sanders), Crown Business, 
2003 UltraPrevention (Ghostwriter for Mark Hyman and Mark Liponis- Medical Directors of Canyon Ranch), Scribners, 
2004 The Bush Survival Bible, Villard, 
2006 The Watch – First Edition, Harry N. Abrams, 
2007 Ultralongevity: The Seven Step Program for a Younger, Healthier You (co-writer with Canyon Ranch Medical Director Mark Liponis), Little, Brown and Company, 
2007 Duck! The Dick Cheney Survival Bible, Villard, 
2008 Saving the World at Work (Ghostwriter for Yahoo! CSO Tim Sanders), Crown Business, 
2009 The Engine 2 Diet (written with Rip Esselstyn), Grand Central, 
2010 The Secrets of People Who Never Get Sick, Workman, 
2011 Start Something That Matters (Ghostwriter for TOMS Shoes founder Blake Mycoskie), Random House, 
2011 Forks Over Knives: The Plant-Based Way to Health (Editor), The Experiment 
2013 Finding the Next Steve Jobs (Co-author with Atari and Chuck E. Cheese Founder Nolan Bushnell), Simon & Schuster, 
2013 My Beef With Meat (Ghostwriter for Rip Esselstyn), Grand Central, 
2014 The Awareness (co-written with Jon Doyle), Stone, 
2015 How Not to Die (co-written with Michael Greger) Flatiron, 
2015 Living the Farm Sanctuary Life (co-written with Farm Sanctuary founder Gene Baur) Rodale, 
2017 The Trump Survival Guide Dey Street, 
2017 Mercy for Animals (co-writer with Mercy for Animals founder Nathan Runkle), Avery, 
2017 The How Not do Die Cookbook (Co-writer with Michael Greger, M.D.), Flatiron, 
2018 Eat for the Planet (co-writer with OneGreenPlanet.org founder Nil Zacharias), Abrams 
2018 The Watch, Thoroughly Revised (co-writer with Stephen Pulvirent), Abrams, 

References

External links
Stone's home page
Stone's appearance on CBS News Sunday Morning discussing The Watch''

1951 births
American animal care and training writers
American animal rights scholars
American male non-fiction writers
American veganism activists
Harvard University alumni
American LGBT rights activists
Living people
Peace Corps volunteers
Plant-based diet advocates
Stanford University alumni
Vegan cookbook writers